George Aaron McCloud (born May 27, 1967) is an American former professional basketball player who played eleven seasons in the National Basketball Association (NBA).

Early life
McCloud attended Mainland High School in Daytona Beach and Florida State University in Tallahassee. While at Florida State, McCloud was among the most discussed NBA prospects in the school’s history.

Professional career
McCloud was selected by the Indiana Pacers in the 1st round (7th overall) of the 1989 NBA Draft. The 6'6" (1.98 m) guard–forward averaged 5.5 points per game overall for the Pacers, perhaps peaking in the 1992 NBA Playoffs as he averaged 11.5 points and 3 assists per game as the Pacers lost to the Boston Celtics in the first round. Earlier that season, McCloud was suspended for one game and fined for a postgame fight with Cleveland’s John Battle. He was released after four seasons and  played basketball in Italy during the 1993–94 season. He signed with the Dallas Mavericks midway through the 1994–95 seasons.

During the 1995-96 season as a member of the Mavericks, appearing in 79 games and averaging 18.9 ppg while setting the NBA record for most 3-point attempts in a season. In his NBA career, McCloud played in 766 games and scored a total of 6,925 points. McCloud was a productive three point shooter throughout his career.  At NBA All-Star Weekend in 1996, he appeared in the Three-point Shootout but lost in the semifinal round.  McCloud has the second-highest total for three-point attempts in an NBA game, with 20 (making seven of them) in a game for the Dallas Mavericks against the New Jersey Nets on March 5, 1996. During the 1998 NBA Playoffs, then on the Suns, McCloud averaged a postseason-best 14.3 points per game as Phoenix lost to the San Antonio Spurs in the first round.

In total, McCloud played a total of 12 years in the NBA from 1989 to 2002. He also played for the Los Angeles Lakers and Denver Nuggets.

References

External links 
 Career stats

1967 births
Living people
African-American basketball players
All-American college men's basketball players
American expatriate basketball people in Italy
American men's basketball players
Basketball players from Florida
Dallas Mavericks players
Denver Nuggets players
Florida State Seminoles men's basketball players
Indiana Pacers draft picks
Indiana Pacers players
Los Angeles Lakers players
Mainland High School alumni
Phoenix Suns players
Rapid City Thrillers players
Shooting guards
Small forwards
Sportspeople from Daytona Beach, Florida
Victoria Libertas Pallacanestro players
21st-century African-American people
20th-century African-American sportspeople